Four Bridges is a census-designated place (CDP) in Liberty Township, Butler County, Ohio, United States. The population was 2,919 at the 2010 census.

Geography
Four Bridges is located along the eastern border of Butler County, in the southeast part of Liberty Township. It is bordered to the south by West Chester Township and to the east by the city of Mason in Warren County. Four Bridges consists primarily of housing developments around two golf courses, Four Bridges Country Club and Green Crest Golf Club.

Interstate 75 forms the western edge of the CDP, with access from Exit 24 (Liberty Way).

Demographics

References

External links
 Four Bridges Homeowners Association
 Four Bridges Country Club

Census-designated places in Ohio
Census-designated places in Butler County, Ohio